Dino De Zordo (born 15 May 1937) is an Italian ski jumper. He competed in the individual event at the 1960 Winter Olympics.

References

External links
 

1937 births
Living people
Italian male ski jumpers
Olympic ski jumpers of Italy
Ski jumpers at the 1960 Winter Olympics
Sportspeople from the Province of Belluno